College Park–University of Maryland station is a Washington Metro station in Prince George's County, Maryland on the Green Line and Yellow Line. It also serves MARC's Camden Line, though only select trains stop at the station.

The station is located in College Park near the University of Maryland, College Park, with entrances at the intersection of Calvert Road and Bowdoin Avenue, and near the intersection of Paint Branch Parkway and River Road. It adjoins the headquarters of the American Physical Society and the Food and Drug Administration (FDA).

This station is planned to be served by the light rail Purple Line, under construction as of 2022.

History
Service at College Park began on December 11, 1993.

An incident on October 4, 1997, saw a single-engine plane crash into the Metro right-of-way west of College Park airport, injuring its six occupants and damaging the Metro fence and railing.

In March 2012, the station became the first Metro station to feature a Bike & Ride facility. A mesh enclosure built into the adjacent parking garage, the facility can hold up to 120 bikes and has 24-hour access. The facility hopes to increase transportation to and from the station by bike.

On June 25, 2017, Yellow Line trains stopped serving the station due to the elimination of Rush+, which is part of major changes to the Metrorail system.

In May 2018, Metro announced an extensive renovation of platforms at twenty stations across the system. The platforms at the College Park–University of Maryland station would be rebuilt starting on May 29, 2021, through September 6, 2021.

Yellow Line trains were re-extended from Mount Vernon Square and Fort Totten to Greenbelt at all service hours beginning May 25, 2019.

From March 26, 2020, until June 28, 2020, this station was closed due to the 2020 coronavirus pandemic.

The Purple Line, a light rail system, is under construction as of 2022 and is scheduled to open in 2026.

Station layout

The station's bus terminal is host to several Metrobus lines, the 14 and 17 lines of The Bus, and the G Route of the Laurel Connect-a-Ride, as well as the university's complimentary Shuttle-UM running from the station to the Stamp Student Union on campus, connecting residents and passengers to Prince George's County, the university, and to Washington, D.C. The 104 bus shuttles students from the Metro to Stamp Student Union.

A multi-level parking garage on the east side of the island-platformed station containing 1,345 parking spaces opened on June 25, 2005.

The Washington Metro station is compliant with the Americans with Disabilities Act of 1990, however the MARC station is not ADA compliant, which prevents some disabled people from transferring from the MARC train to the DC Metro. The MARC station lacks several accessible design elements, including raised platforms for boarding as well as tactile paving along the edges of the platform.

MARC trains, on the Camden Line, stop at this station on a set of tracks that are parallel to the Metro tracks. These tracks are accessible from the west side of the station and also via a pedestrian tunnel that passes under the Metro tracks. The station is unstaffed, but has an automated Ticket Vending Machine (TVM) that riders can use to buy tickets. Since the TVM was added, riders that choose to purchase tickets on board the train must pay an additional $5 fee.

References

External links

 The Schumin Web Transit Center: College Park-U of Md Station
 Calvert Road entrance to Metro from Google Maps Street View
 MARC Station from Google Maps Street View

Camden Line
Stations on the Green Line (Washington Metro)
Purple Line (Maryland)
University of Maryland, College Park
Washington Metro stations in Maryland
MARC Train stations
Stations on the Yellow Line (Washington Metro)
Railway stations in Prince George's County, Maryland
Railway stations in the United States opened in 1993
1993 establishments in Maryland
Railway stations in Maryland at university and college campuses